Vancouver is the most populous city in British Columbia, Canada.

Vancouver may also refer to:

Places
 Mount Vancouver, a mountain on the Yukon–Alaska border
 Mount Vancouver (New Zealand), a mountain in the Southern Alps on the South Island of New Zealand

Canada
 Greater Vancouver, a metropolitan area whose urban center is Vancouver, BC
 Metro Vancouver Regional District, a British Columbia regional district that encompasses Vancouver and surrounding municipalities
 Vancouver (electoral districts), electoral districts in Vancouver, BC
 Vancouver Island, a major landmass off the western coast of British Columbia
 Vancouver River, a river emptying into Prince of Wales Reach of Jervis Inlet

United States
 Vancouver, Washington
 Fort Vancouver, a 19th-century fur trading post in present-day Vancouver
 Vancouver Barracks, a former U.S. Army station near Fort Vancouver
 Vancouver Lake, a lake in Clark County, Washington

Vessels 
 Vancouver (1826 vessel), a vessel operated by the Hudson's Bay Company from 1826 to 1834
 Vancouver (steamboat) , a cargo steamer owned and operated by the Hudson's Bay Company from 1838 to 1848
 Vancouver (1852 vessel), a vessel operated by the Hudson's Bay Company from 1852 to 1853
 HMCS Vancouver (F6A), a Royal Canadian Navy S-class destroyer
 HMCS Vancouver (FFH 331), a Canadian Forces Halifax-class frigate
 USS Vancouver (LPD-2), a US Navy Raleigh-class amphibious transport dock

Music
 Vancouver (album), a 2009 album by Matthew Good
 Vancouver (EP), a 2006 EP by La Dispute
 Bobby Taylor & the Vancouvers, a 1960s-vintage Motown band

Other uses 
 Vancouver Expedition, a 1791 voyage commanded by George Vancouver
 Vancouver system, a style of referencing
 Vancouver Special, an architectural style
 Vancouverism, an urban planning and architectural phenomenon

People with the surname
 George Vancouver (1757–1798), British naval officer and explorer

See also 
 
 
 East Vancouver, a region within Vancouver, British Columbia
 North Vancouver (city)
 North Vancouver (district municipality)
 West Vancouver, a city in Metro Vancouver, British Columbia
 Vancouver Bay, British Columbia, a locality and former cannery town on Jervis Inlet